Rolf Aggestam (21 December 1941 – 27 December 2020) was a Swedish poet, writer and translator. Aggestam was born in Stockholm. His first poetry collection was published in 1973, Ditt hjärta är ett rött tåg. He made his debut as a prose writer in 1994. He drew his inspiration from Dylan Thomas and Walt Whitman. Aggestam translated the works of the latter.

Aggestam studied at the University of Lund in the 1960s. He was an editor of the magazine Lyrikvännen in the years 1973–1977, and also an editor of the literary calendar Halifax with Katarina Frostenson from 1987-96. Aggestam received several prizes for his poetry, among others: Sveriges Radios lyrikpris, Eyvind Johnson-priset and Gerard Bonniers lyrikpris.

Bibliography 
 1973 – Ditt hjärta är ett rött tåg 
 1975 – Glimmer 
 1979 – Rost 
 1980 – Häpp, hopp 
 1986 – Med handen om pennan 
 1992 – Foder 
 1994 – Niagara! 
 1998 – Att flå en blixt 
 2003 – I detta ögonblick

Awards 
 1986 – Sveriges Radios Lyrikpris
 1994 – Beskowska resestipendiet
 1995 – Eyvind Johnsonpriset
 1997 – De Nios Vinterpris
 1999 – Gerard Bonniers lyrikpris
 2018 – Aspenströmpriset
 2018 – Karl Vennbergs pris

References

1941 births
2020 deaths
21st-century translators
Swedish male poets
21st-century Swedish poets
20th-century translators
20th-century Swedish poets
Swedish translators
English–Swedish translators
Swedish editors
Lund University alumni
Swedish magazine editors
20th-century Swedish male writers
Writers from Stockholm